"When the Lights Go Down" is a song written by Craig Wiseman, Jeffrey Steele, and Rivers Rutherford, recorded by American country pop singer Faith Hill. It was released to country radio November 19, 2002, as the second single from her fifth studio album, Cry (2002). The second of three songs from the album promoted to country radio, "When the Lights Go Down" peaked at number 26 on the Billboard Hot Country Songs chart in 2003. At the time, this was Hill's lowest position on the chart since "But I Will" peaked at number 35 in 1994.

The song inspired the name of Hill's NBC concert special (taped in September 2002 and aired in November of that year), as well as her live DVD featuring performances from the same, released May 6, 2003. A Europe-exclusive CD single, released in February 2003, also contains a live version of "Stronger" taken from this concert.

Composition
"When the Lights Go Down" is a midtempo country pop-styled power ballad with a duration of four minutes and six seconds (4:06). It was written by Craig Wiseman, Jeffrey Steele, and Rivers Rutherford and was produced by Faith Hill and Dann Huff. According to the digital sheet music published on Musicnotes.com through Universal Music Publishing Group, it was originally composed and recorded in the key of F major (published in the key of G major) and set in simple time to a "moderately slow" tempo of 72 BPM. Hill's vocals range from G–E.

Music video
The video for "When the Lights Go Down" was directed by Gary Halvorson. It won the award for Hottest Female Video of the Year at the 2003 CMT Flameworthy Music Video Awards.

Track listing
German CD single
 "When the Lights Go Down" – 4:06
 "Stronger"  – 4:28
 "If You're Gonna Fly Away" – 3:48

Credits and personnel
Credits are lifted from the Cry album booklet.

Studios
 Recorded at Emerald Entertainment, The Sound Kitchen (Nashville, Tennessee) and The Hit Factory (New York City)
 Strings recorded at Ocean Way Recording (Los Angeles)
 Mixed at South Beach Studios (Miami, Florida)
 Mastered at The Mastering Lab (Hollywood, California)

Main personnel

 Craig Wiseman – writing
 Jeffrey Steele – writing
 Rivers Rutherford – writing
 Faith Hill – vocals, production
 Chris Rodriguez – background vocals
 Lisa Cochran – background vocals
 Bekka Bramlett – background vocals
 Jerry McPherson – guitar
 Dann Huff – guitar, production
 Jimmie Lee Sloas – bass
 Matt Rollings – piano
 Tim Akers – keyboards
 Vinnie Colaiuta – drums
 Eric Darken – percussion
 Jeff Balding – recording
 Pat Woodward – recording assistant
 Matt Snedecor – recording assistant
 Mark Hagen – additional recording
 Allen Ditto – additional recording
 Jon Balding – additional recording assistant
 Dino Herrmann – Pro Tools engineering
 Tom Lord-Alge – mixing
 Femio Hernandez – mixing assistant
 Doug Sax – mastering
 Robert Hadley – mastering

Strings

 Suzie Katayama – conducting, orchestra management
 Joel Derouin – violin
 Charlie Bisharat – violin
 Eve Butler – violin
 Darius Campo – violin
 Susan Chatman – violin
 Mario Deleon – violin
 Armen Garabedian – violin
 Sara Parkins – violin
 Bob Peterson – violin
 Michele Richards – violin
 Mark Robertson – violin
 John Wittenberg – violin
 John Hayhurst – viola
 Denyse Buffum – viola
 Matt Funes – viola
 Karie Prescott – viola
 Larry Corbett – cello
 Steve Richards – cello
 Rudy Stein – cello
 Miguel Martinez – cello
 David Campbell – arrangement
 Steve Churchyard – recording
 Greg Burns – recording assistant

Charts

Release history

References

2002 singles
2002 songs
Country ballads
Faith Hill songs
Pop ballads
Song recordings produced by Dann Huff
Songs written by Rivers Rutherford
Songs written by Craig Wiseman
Songs written by Jeffrey Steele
Warner Records singles